More Hits of the 50's and 60's (also released as Frankly Basie and Frankly Speaking) is an album released by pianist and bandleader Count Basie and his orchestra featuring jazz versions of songs associated with the singer Frank Sinatra recorded in 1963. It was arranged by Billy Byers and was originally released on the Verve label.

Reception

AllMusic awarded the album 3 stars.

Track listing
 "The Second Time Around" (Jimmy Van Heusen, Sammy Cahn) - 4:34
 "Hey! Jealous Lover" (Kay Twomey, Bee Walker, Cahn) - 2:47
 "I'll Never Smile Again" (Ruth Lowe) - 3:32
 "Saturday Night (Is the Loneliest Night of the Week)" (Jule Styne, Cahn) - 4:07
 "This Love of Mine" (Sol Parker, Hank Sanicola, Frank Sinatra) - 3:09
 "I Thought About You" (Van Heusen, Johnny Mercer) - 2:55
 "In the Wee Small Hours of the Morning" (David Mann, Bob Hilliard) - 3:14
 "Come Fly With Me" (Van Heusen, Cahn) - 2:43
 "On the Road to Mandalay" (Oley Speaks, Rudyard Kipling) - 2:55
 "Only the Lonely" (Van Heusen, Cahn) - 3:18
 "South of the Border" (Michael Carr, Jimmy Kennedy) - 3:53
 "All of Me" (Gerald Marks, Seymour Simons) - 3:02

Personnel 
Count Basie - piano
Al Aarons, Sonny Cohn, Rickie Fortunatus, Don Rader, Fip Ricard - trumpet
Henry Coker, Urbie Green, Grover Mitchell, Benny Powell - trombone
Marshal Royal - alto saxophone, clarinet
Eric Dixon, Frank Foster, Frank Wess - tenor saxophone, alto saxophone, flute
Charlie Fowlkes - baritone saxophone
Freddie Green - guitar
Buddy Catlett - bass
Sonny Payne - drums
Billy Byers - arranger, conductor

References 

1963 albums
Albums arranged by Billy Byers
Count Basie Orchestra albums
Frank Sinatra tribute albums
Verve Records albums